Nordstrandischmoor (North Frisian: Lätj Möör; also known locally as Lüttmoor) is a Hallig (undyked islet) off the North Frisian coast in Germany and lies within the Schleswig-Holstein Wadden Sea National Park.

Geography 
Administratively, Nordstrandischmoor belongs to the municipality of Nordstrand and is one of its parishes. The Hallig has an area of 1.9 km2. In the spring of 2008, 27 people lived on Nordstrandischmoor.

Its link with the mainland is the  Lüttmoorsiel-Nordstrandischmoor island railway a construction railway with a rail gauge of 600 mm, which runs to the mainland at Beltringharder Koog in the municipality of Reußenköge. At high tide, ships can also dock. At low tide the Hallig may also be reached on foot over the mudflats.

On the island, there are four warfs, artificial dwelling mounds on which are located a primary school (with 3 students, the smallest school in Germany - as at 2010) and a restaurant. The four warfs, from east to west are:

Gallery

References

External links 

 Hallig Nordstrandischmoor 

Halligen
Tidal islands of Germany
Islands of Schleswig-Holstein